San Giuseppe  is a Baroque-style Roman Catholic church in Milan, region of Lombardy, Italy.

Construction was begun in 1607 and completed in 1630. The architect was Francesco Maria Richini. The right side of the church overlooks Via Andegari, after a family with this name.  It seems that the title of the street comes from the name of a family known as the "Andegardi" or "undegardi".

The interior contains large altarpieces depicting the Marriage of St Joseph and the Virgin Mary by Melchiorre Gherardini; the Death of St Joseph by Giulio Cesare Procaccini; a Holy Family by Andrea Lanzani; and a St John the Baptist by Stefano Montalti.

References

Roman Catholic churches completed in 1630
Giuseppe
Giuseppe
17th-century Roman Catholic church buildings in Italy
1630 establishments in Italy
Octagonal churches in Italy